Paul Sidney Laune (1899 in Woodward, Oklahoma – 1977) was a writer, painter and illustrator, known for his book covers and for paintings he did of rural Western U.S. pioneer scenes. He covered pioneers, ranch-life, quarter horses in his paintings. He painted five murals for the Plains Indians and Pioneers Museum in his hometown of Woodward, Oklahoma.

After graduating from the University of Oklahoma, Laune worked as an illustrator and art critic in New York. He also lived in Phoenix, Arizona, where he drew quarter horses and wrote a book on them.

Among the more famous works he illustrated, were books in the Hardy Boys Mystery Series.

Works
The Forgotten Books Of Eden. Illustrations, 1930.
The Secret Warning. Hardy Boys Mystery Series, illustrations, 1938
The Thirsty Pony, author, cover art and illustrations, 1940
The Clue of the Broken Blade. Hardy Boys Mystery Series #21, illustrator, 1942
The Flickering Torch Mystery. Hardy Boys Mystery Series #22, illustrator
The Mustang Roundup, author
The Silver Chalice, illustrations, 1952
Southwest, John Houghton Allen, 1952
When the Legends Die, book cover, 1963
America's Quarter Horses, author, 1977

References

External links
 
Pictures of the Rotunda with murals by Paule Laune and  Pat “Kemoha” Patterson.

1899 births
1977 deaths
People from Woodward, Oklahoma
20th-century American painters
American male painters
20th-century American writers
American muralists
American illustrators
Painters from Oklahoma
Writers from Oklahoma
University of Oklahoma alumni
20th-century American male artists